Nihali, also known as Nahali or erroneously as Kalto, is a moribund language isolate that is spoken in west-central India (in Madhya Pradesh and Maharashtra), with approximately 2,000 people in 1991 out of an ethnic population of 5,000. The Nihali tribal area is just south of the Tapti River, around the village of Tembi in Burhanpur district of Madhya Pradesh. Speakers of the Nihali language are also present in several villages of the Buldhana district in Maharashtra such as Jamod, Sonbardi, Kuvardev, Chalthana, Ambavara, Wasali, and Cicari. There are dialectal differences between the Kuvardev-Chalthana and the Jamod-Sonbardi varieties.

The language has a very large number of words adopted from neighboring languages, with 60–70% apparently taken from Korku (25% of vocabulary and much of its morphology), from Dravidian languages, and from Marathi, but much of its core vocabulary cannot be related to them or other languages, such as the numerals and words for "blood" and "egg". Scholars state that less than 25% of the language's original vocabulary is used today. There are no longer any surviving monolingual speakers of the language. Those well-versed in modern Nihali are likely to speak varieties of Marathi, Hindi or Korku as well.

For centuries, most Nihali have often worked as agricultural labourers, for speakers of languages other than their own. In particular, Nihali labourers have often worked for members of the Korku people, and are often bilingual in the Korku language. Because of this history, Nihali is sometimes used by its speakers only to prevent native Korku speakers and other outsiders from understanding them.

Linguistic situation
Franciscus Kuiper was the first to suggest that Nihali may be unrelated to any other Indian language, with the non-Korku, non-Dravidian core vocabulary being the remnant of an earlier population in India. However, he did not rule out that it may be a Munda language, like Korku. Kuiper suggested that Nihali may differ from neighbouring languages, such as Korku, mostly in its function as an argot, such as a thieves' cant. Kuiper's assertions stem, in part, from the fact that many oppressed groups within India have used secret languages to prevent outsiders from understanding them.
 
Linguist Norman Zide describes the recent history of the language  as follows:
"Nihali's borrowings are far more massive than in such textbook examples of heavy outside acquisition as Albanian." In this respect, says Zide, modern Nihali seems comparable to hybridised dialects of Romani spoken in Western Europe. Zide claims that this is a result of a historical process that began with a massacre of Nihalis in the early 19th century, organised by one of the rulers of the area, supposedly in response to "marauding". Zide alleges that, afterwards, the Nihalis "decimated in size", have "functioned largely as raiders and thieves ... who [have] disposed of ... stolen goods" through "outside associates".  Zide adds that Nihali society has "long been multilingual, and uses Nihali as a more or less secret language which is not ordinarily revealed to outsiders" and that early researchers "attempting to learn the language were, apparently, deliberately rebuffed or misled".

Some Korku-speakers refuse to acknowledge the Nihali as a distinct community, and describe the emergence of the Nihalis as resulting from a disruption of Korku civil society.

The Nihali live similarly to the Kalto. That and the fact that Kalto has often been called Nahali led to confusion of the two languages.

Phonology 

Lengthening of vowels is phonemic. The vowels [e] and [o] have lower varieties at the end of morphemes.

Nasalization is rare and tends to occur in borrowed words.

There are 33 consonants. Unaspirated stops are more frequent than aspirated stops.

Lexicon
Below are some Nihali basic vocabulary words without clear external parallels (in Korku, Hindi, Marathi, Dravidian, etc.) listed in the appendix of Nagaraja (2014).

Body parts

Animals and plants

Natural phenomena

Material culture, kinship

Verbs
(In Nihali, many verbs are suffixed with -be.)

Pronouns and demonstratives
The personal pronouns in Nihali are (Nagaraja 2014: 34):

Nagaraja (2014: 139) notes that Nihali has a different demonstrative paradigm than that of Korku.

Morphosyntax
Nihali morphosyntax is much simpler than that of Korku and other Munda languages, and is unrelated to that of Munda languages (Nagaraja 2014: 144). Word order is SOV.

See also
Nihali word list (Wiktionary)

References

External links 
Audio sample of Nihali language

 
Language isolates of Asia
Languages of India
Endangered language isolates
Endangered languages of India